Głogowiec  is a village in the administrative district of Gmina Nowosolna, within Łódź East County, Łódź Voivodeship, in central Poland.

The village has an approximate population of 40.

References
 Central Statistical Office (GUS) Population: Size and Structure by Administrative Division - (2007-12-31) (in Polish)

Villages in Łódź East County